Desmoxytes cervina, is a species of millipede in the family Paradoxosomatidae. It is known from Myanmar (Lenya National Park) and Thailand (Chumphon, Krabi, Nakhon Si Thammarat, Phang Nga, Phuket, Ranong, and Surat Thani).

References 

Animals described in 1895
cervina